William McCloundy (born 1859 or 1860), also known as I.O.U. O'Brien, was an early 20th-century confidence trickster, from Asbury Park, New Jersey, who served a two-and-a-half-year prison term in Sing Sing for selling the Brooklyn Bridge to a tourist in 1901.

See also
 Brooklyn Bridge#Culture — other information about selling the Brooklyn Bridge
 George C. Parker

References

American confidence tricksters
Criminals from New York City
People from Asbury Park, New Jersey
Year of birth uncertain
Year of death missing
19th-century births
20th-century deaths